The hierarchical fair-service curve (HFSC) is a network scheduling algorithm for a network scheduler proposed by Ion Stoica, Hui Zhang and T. S. Eugene from Carnegie Mellon University at SIGCOMM 1997

It is based on a QoS and CBQ. 
An implementation of HFSC is available in all operating systems based on the Linux kernel, such as e.g. OpenWrt, and also in DD-WRT, NetBSD 5.0, FreeBSD 8.0 and OpenBSD 4.6.

References

External links 
Hierarchical Packet Schedulers
HFSC Scheduling with Linux
HFSC Tutorial
HFSC and VoIP « Maciej Bliziński

Network performance
Network scheduling algorithms